Waldo Township may refer to the following townships in the United States:

 Waldo Township, Livingston County, Illinois
 Waldo Township, Russell County, Kansas
 Waldo Township, Marion County, Ohio